Robert A. Harris (born 1945) is an American film historian, archivist, and film preservationist.

Life 
Robert A. Harris was born in 1945.

Harris is often working with James C. Katz and has restored such films as Lawrence of Arabia, Vertigo, and My Fair Lady.

He was also a producer of two films: The Grifters (1990) and Space Avenger (1990).

Restorations 
 Lawrence of Arabia (1962), restored 1989
 Spartacus (1960), restored 1991
 My Fair Lady (1964), restored 1994
 Vertigo (1958), restored 1996
 Rear Window (1954), restored 2000
 Williamsburg: the Story of a Patriot (1956), restored 2004
 The Godfather (1972), restored 2008
 The Godfather Part II (1974), restored 2008
 It's a Mad, Mad, Mad, Mad World (1963), restored 2013
 Triumph of the Will (1935), restored 2015

Published works

Awards and legacy 
Harris and James C. Katz received the King Vidor Award for Excellence in Filmmaking at the 2000 San Luis Obispo International Film Festival.

In 2010, Harris was honored by the International Press Academy with its Nikola Tesla Award for Visionary Achievement in Filmmaking Technology.

The Academy Film Archive of the Academy of Motion Picture Arts and Sciences is home to the Robert A. Harris Collection, which consists of film, video tape, and audio material related to Harris' restoration work; it includes over 1,100 items.

References

External links 
 
 Yellow Layer Failure, Vinegar Syndrome and Miscellaneous Musings: Harris' column at The Digital Bits (2002–2009) Note, this is a site archive, and its hyperlinks have to be manually modified to allow viewing.

American film producers
1945 births
Living people
American film historians
Place of birth missing (living people)
American male non-fiction writers
Film preservation
American archivists